Savnik is a Slovene surname. Notable people with the surname include:

Bojan Savnik (born 1914)
Bojan Savnik (general) (1930-1976) 
Davorin Savnik (born 1929)
Dušan Savnik (1919–1975)
Ivan Savnik (1879–1950)
Miran Savnik (born 1955)
Roman Savnik (1902–1987)
Viktor Savnik (1910–1988)

Slovene-language surnames